Frederick Iltid Nicholl (8 July 1814 – 25 February 1893) was an English lawyer and a cricketer who played cricket for Cambridge University in a match in 1835 that has subsequently been judged to have been first-class. He was born and died in London.

Nicholl was educated at Eton College and Trinity College, Cambridge. Nicholl's record as a cricketer is sketchy. He opened the innings for Cambridge University in a single match against Marylebone Cricket Club in July 1835, failed to score in either innings and is not recorded as bowling; nor, indeed, is there any record of him playing in any further matches, even minor games.

Nicholl graduated from Cambridge University with a Bachelor of Arts degree in 1836 and became a solicitor in London, practising from an address near the Royal Courts of Justice in The Strand.

References

1814 births
1893 deaths
English cricketers
Cambridge University cricketers
People educated at Eton College
Alumni of Trinity College, Cambridge